Jeffrey G. Barnett, is an American stunt performer and stunt coordinator for film and television.

Selected filmography
As stunt Coordinator

 2019-2022 – Euphoria
 2021 – North Hollywood
 2018-2020 – 9-1-1
 2018 – Ballers
 2016-2018 – Baskets

 2017 – Creep 2
 2017 – Silicon Valley
 2012-2017 – Switched at Birth
 2009 – Southland
 2007 – Aliens in America

Awards and nominations

References

External links
 

Living people
American male film actors
American stunt performers
Stunt doubles
Year of birth missing (living people)